Martinuzzi may refer to:

 Martinuzzi Castle, a medieval castle in Vințu de Jos, in the Transylvania region of Romania
 Fernando Martinuzzi, an Argentinian/Italian soccer player
 George Martinuzzi, a Croatian nobleman, Pauline monk and Hungarian statesman

See also 

 Martinozzi